Wheel stops may refer to:
 Wheel chocks, for aircraft or road vehicles
 Railway wheel stops